Coelatura cridlandi is a species of freshwater mussel, an aquatic bivalve mollusk in the family Unionidae, the river mussels. This species is found in Africa, in Kenya, Tanzania, and Uganda. Its natural habitat is freshwater lakes.

References

Unionidae
Freshwater bivalves
Molluscs described in 1954
Taxonomy articles created by Polbot